The West Los Angeles Veloway is a bike-bridge project prepared by the Citizens Committee for the West Los Angeles Veloway in 1982-3. The Committee was led by UCLA Faculty David Eisenberg. The planning for the project attracted grant funding. The project also survived for many years as a planning option in the Metro Long Range Transportation Plan. It is also listed in records of the California Transport Commission 1999. It was never constructed. Its aim was to create improved bicycle access to UCLA campus from the South and the West. Those involved with the project envisioned it as a spectacular structure, and hoped to complete it for the 1984 Olympics in Los Angeles. The naming of the structure goes back to the California Cycleway constructed at the end of the 19th century.

The West Los Angeles Veloway is not to be confused with a Class 1 bike path which starts at the Northeast corner of the Westwood Federal Building in Los Angeles, and runs South from Wilshire Boulevard along Veteran Avenue's Western sidewalk. At the South end of the Federal Building property, it turns West through Westwood Park, crosses Sepulveda Boulevard, runs South along the baseball diamonds, then turns West and runs on the wide sidewalk of Ohio Avenue, under Interstate 405, to Purdue Avenue, where it becomes a Class 3 bike route. The Eastbound (South side) on Ohio Avenue is entirely a Class 2 bike lane between Purdue Ave and Sepulveda Bl.

See also
Santa Monica Cycle Path
California Cycleway

External links

The West Los Angeles Veloway Summary Report: Phase 1 & Phase 2 / Urban Innovations Group. Los Angeles: Urban Innovations Group, 1984. 
Urban Innovations Group: The West Los Angeles Veloway Feasibility Study / Prepared by Urban Innovations Group for the Citizens Committee for the West Los Angeles Veloway. Los Angeles 1982-1983.
UCLA to Westwood Village Link, Bicycle Veloway System, Los Angeles: Environmental Impact Statement 1989. Available at Northwestern University Transportation Library, Record ID FHWA-CA-890285 
"Treasures" Episode 1. The Los Angeles Beach Bike Path .

Bike paths in Los Angeles